= Arab Egypt =

Arab Egypt may refer to

- Egypt after the Arab conquest of AD 639, see History of Muslim Egypt
- modern Egypt under a state doctrine of Pan-Arabism, see
  - United Arab Republic (1958-1971)
  - Arab Republic of Egypt (1971-present)
- Arab Egyptians
